Could You Be the One? may refer to:

 Could You Be the One? (Hüsker Dü song)
 Could You Be the One? (Stereophonics song)